Ndame Arrondissement is an arrondissement of the Mbacké Department in the Diourbel Region of Senegal.

Subdivisions
The arrondissement is divided administratively into rural communities and in turn into villages.

Notable people
Serigne Abdou Khadr Mbacké, the fourth Mouride caliph, was born in 1914 in Daaru Alimul Kabir in Ndame.

References

Arrondissements of Senegal
Diourbel Region